Johan Eberhard Carlberg (February 24, 1683 in Gothenburg, Sweden – October 22, 1773 in Stockholm), was a Swedish fortification officer and architect. He was Gothenburg's first city engineer, a position he held from 1717 until 1727. In 1727, he was appointed city architect in Stockholm, where he stayed for 45 years until 1772. During this time, he also began an influential school of architecture. He was an older brother of the engineer and architect Bengt Wilhelm Carlberg, who replaced him as a city engineer in Gothenburg when Johan Eberhard moved to Stockholm.

Life and works

Carlberg began work in 1700 at the fortification in Marstrand, working at first as a volunteer but later (January 11, 1702 until 1703) as project leader. 
In 1703, Carlberg became a lieutenant in the Närkes and Värmlands reserve regiment (Swedish "tremänningsregementen"), participating in their field training in Latvia and Lithuania. In Gothenburg, Carlberg became a lieutenant at the fortification on November 19, 1709 and the city engineer on September 14, 1717.  He resigned from the Gothenburg fortification with the rank of captain on February 18, 1721. 

Carlberg took office on April 27, 1727 as a city architect in Stockholm, where he was responsible for the rebuilding of Slussen 1744–1753, the customs pavilions at Norrtull, the rebuilding of Alstavik on Långholmen, reconstruction of Danviken hospital, the church tower of Stockholm's Great Church, the reconstruction of the Bonde Palace and the Stora Sjötullen in Blockhusudden) in 1729. The Army's commissariat warehouse (1728–32 ) at Skeppsholmen is Carlberg's only fully preserved monumental building in Stockholm. As city architect, he issued regulations intended to promote harmonious appearance of neighboring buildings and also established a "school" to train young architects. His critics, while praising Carlberg's "force and vigor" warned that "If you put more iron into the fire than you have time to watch over, many will get burned." Erik Palmstedt was one of the students in Carlstadt's "school," which he entered when only 14 years old.

Johan Eberhard Carlberg owned and lived in a house he inherited from his mother at the eastern side of Korsgatan and Vallgatan's north side in Gothenburg. The Carlbergsgatan street in the district of Gårda in Gothenburg is named for the Carlberg family. In the district of Överkikaren at Hornsgatan 24 in Södermalm, he designed and built a residential building in 1731–32 as his private residence (see ).

Family
Carlberg's father Johan Carlberg (1638–1701) was bishop of Gothenburg 1689–1701.  Carlberg himself married three times: first, on June 24, 1708 with Magdalena von Seth (1686–1717), second, on 25th May 1718 with Birgitta Thingvall (1699–1732), and third, in 1733 with his second wife's cousin Christina Engel Geijer (1713–1781).

References

1673 births
1773 deaths
18th-century Swedish architects
People from Gothenburg